Vispipuuro (Finnish "whipped porridge"), russedessert (Norwegian), vispgröt/klappgröt/klappkräm (Swedish name) or mannavaht (Estonian name) is a sweet, wheat semolina (manna) dessert porridge made with berries, usually lingonberries. It is eaten in Finland, Norway, Sweden and Estonia. The semolina is cooked with the berries and also some kind of sweetener. Note that in Sweden, it's usually made by adding lingonberry cordial to the water, in which the semolina is cooked, as the texture is supposed to be smooth, so you don't want little bits of berries in the porridge. Alternatively, the berries are strained out before the semolina is added. After the mixture has cooled down, the porridge is vigorously whipped to a light, mousse-like consistency. Alternatively, the pot the porridge was made in, can be put in the kitchen sink, partially filled with cold water and whisked it in the pot, so it cools down while being whisked with a hand mixer. The dessert is usually served with milk and optionally sugar. Other berries and fruit that can be used are redcurrants, cranberries, apricots, gooseberries and strawberries.

See also
 
 List of porridges

References

External links
 Glossary of Finnish Dishes

Swedish desserts
Finnish cuisine
Swedish cuisine
Estonian cuisine
Norwegian cuisine
Porridges
Fruit dishes